The Global Legal Post is a digest for general counsel and business lawyers that examines the world's legal media, analysis and comment. 

It was created in 2012 by the merger of The Global Lawyer, The European Lawyer and LegalDay.com.

References

External links
 

2012 establishments in the United Kingdom
Business magazines published in the United Kingdom
Law of the United Kingdom
Legal magazines
Magazines established in 2012
Professional and trade magazines